Government of Ireland Act may refer to:

 Government of Ireland Act 1914, Act passed by the Parliament of the United Kingdom intended to provide home rule (self-government within the United Kingdom) for Ireland
 Government of Ireland Act 1920, Act of the Parliament of the United Kingdom, intended to partition Ireland into two self-governing polities: the six north-eastern counties were to form "Northern Ireland", while the larger part of the country was to form "Southern Ireland"